was a Japanese politician who served as governor of Hiroshima Prefecture from January 1937 to November 1938. He was governor of Mie Prefecture from 1935 to 1937.

Governors of Hiroshima
Governors of Mie Prefecture
Japanese Home Ministry government officials
1885 births
1954 deaths